Éva Székely (3 April 1927 – 29 February 2020) was a Hungarian swimmer. She won the gold medal at the 1952 Summer Olympics in Helsinki and the silver medal at the 1956 Summer Olympics, set six world records, and won 44 national titles. She held the first world record in the 400 m individual medley in 1953.

Biography
Székely was born in Budapest, Hungary.

In 1941 Székely set a national speed record, although she was barely allowed to start because she was a Jew. Mother was ortodox jewish from upper Hungary, father szekler( magyar) from Transsylvania. As a child, she competed for a local swim team. In 1941, at 14 years of age, she was expelled from the team because she was Jewish. She was excluded from competition for the next four years, and survived the Holocaust partly because she was a famous swimmer.  Towards the end of World War II, she lived with 41 people in a crowded two-room “safe-house” in Budapest run by the Swiss, and to keep in shape, every day she ran up and down five flights of stairs 100 times.

At the end of World War II she met her husband, Dezső Gyarmati, from whom she was later divorced and who in 2013 predeceased her, who was a three-time Olympic water polo champion (1952, 1956, and 1964) in water polo. Her daughter, Andrea Gyarmati, born in 1954, was a backstroke and butterfly swimmer who won two medals at the 1972 Summer Olympics in Munich. After the Hungarian Revolution of 1956 the family defected to the US but they did not stay, returning to Hungary to care for Székely's parents.

She won three gold medals at the 1947 World University Games. She won five gold medals at the 1951 World University Championship.

She won the gold medal in the 200-meter breaststroke (setting a new Olympic record) at the 1952 Summer Olympics in Helsinki, and the silver medal at the 1956 Summer Olympics.  She also set six world records, and won 44 national titles. She held the first world record in the 400 m individual medley, in 1953.

After retiring from competitions Székely worked as a pharmacist and swimming coach, training her daughter among others.

In 1976 she was inducted into the International Swimming Hall of Fame. She was named as one of Hungary’s Athletes of the Nation in 2004, and received the Prima Primissima award in 2011.  She was also inducted into the International Jewish Sports Hall of Fame.

Death
Székely died on 29 February 2020 at Budapest at the age of 92.

Publications
She authored three books, one of which was translated into other languages:

 Only winners are allowed to cry!  (Sírni csak a győztesnek szabad!) Budapest, 1981, Magvető Kiadó
 I came, I saw, I lost?  (Jöttem, láttam… Vesztettem?) Budapest, 1986, Magvető Kiadó
 I Swam It/I Survived  (Megúsztam) Budapest, 1989, Sport Kiadó

See also
 List of members of the International Swimming Hall of Fame
List of select Jewish swimmers

References

External links
 "Éva Székely; Jewish Holocaust Survivor; Interview language: Hungarian (video)"
 
 
 

1927 births
2020 deaths
Hungarian female breaststroke swimmers
Jewish swimmers
Hungarian Jews
Olympic swimmers of Hungary
Swimmers at the 1948 Summer Olympics
Swimmers at the 1952 Summer Olympics
Swimmers at the 1956 Summer Olympics
Swimmers from Budapest
Olympic silver medalists for Hungary
Olympic gold medalists for Hungary
World record setters in swimming
European Aquatics Championships medalists in swimming
Medalists at the 1956 Summer Olympics
Medalists at the 1952 Summer Olympics
Olympic gold medalists in swimming
Olympic silver medalists in swimming
Hungarian female swimmers
20th-century Hungarian women
21st-century Hungarian women